Kingsbury is a London Underground station in northwest London, England. It is on the Jubilee line between Queensbury and Wembley Park stations, in Zone 4, in the borough of Brent.

Although now only served by deep-level tube trains, the section of line serving the station is built to surface gauge, and trains to that larger LU loading gauge occasionally pass through.

History

It was opened on 10 December 1932 as part of the Stanmore branch of the Metropolitan Railway and served by that company's electric trains. After the formation of London Transport in 1933 this branch became part of the LU Metropolitan line and was later transferred to the Bakerloo line in 1939 then to the Jubilee line in 1979.  The design style is similar to that of other Metropolitan Railway buildings of the same period rather than to the concrete and glass style used at the same time by the LER group. In common with other nearby Metropolitan Railway stations (e.g. Harrow-on-the-Hill, Neasden, Queensbury) there is an element of fiction in the station name; the area is properly within the eastern extent of Kenton (Kingsbury Road at this point was originally part of the eastern end of Kenton Lane) and Kingsbury proper is actually closer to Neasden LU station.

Location
The station entrance is in a parade of shops on the south side of the A4006 Kingsbury Road, opposite Berkeley Road.

Connections
London Buses routes 79, 183, 204 and 324, night route N98 and non-TFL route 644 serve the station.

References

Gallery

Jubilee line stations
London Underground Night Tube stations
Tube stations in the London Borough of Brent
Former Metropolitan Railway stations
Railway stations in Great Britain opened in 1932